Michael Trikilis (July 14, 1940 – December 28, 2019) was an American film and television producer, known mostly for his involvement with Playboy TV. In 1981, Trikilis, along with Hugh Hefner, developed much of the original programming for "The Playboy Channel". Most notably, Trikilis developed the signature  "Playboy style" of video, which features women, Playboy Playmates and Celebrity Centerfolds, often in dreamlike versions of their everyday lives. He has appeared as himself on E!'s reality show The Girls Next Door.

Trikilis has also produced several feature films, including Six Pack (1982) and The Death of Ocean View Park (1979).

Personal life

Trikilis was the first husband of Marianne Gordon<ref></ref

References

External links
 

2019 deaths
Businesspeople from Youngstown, Ohio
Television producers from Ohio
Playboy people
Film producers from Ohio
1940 births
20th-century American businesspeople